The left bank of the Estuary of Bilbao (Spanish, Margen Izquierda / Basque, Ezkerraldea) is a part of the Greater Bilbao region, its main towns are Barakaldo, Sestao, Santurtzi and Portugalete and in addition to the iron mines (Zona Minera or Mehatzaldea), was the heart of the intense industrialisation of Biscay. Thousands of workers from all Spain came to the area during the 19th and the 20th century to work in the major shipbuilding and steel industries like Altos Hornos de Vizcaya and La Naval.
Hence it was one of the birthplaces of the worker movement in Spain.
The Socialist leader Indalecio Prieto and the Communist Pasionaria found their initial audiences here.

There was a geographical and political-economical counterposition between the left bank where the workers lived and the Right Bank where the industrialists and bourgeois had their villas.

Estuary of Bilbao
Geography of Biscay